Margaret Naumburg (May 14, 1890 – February 26, 1983) was an American psychologist, educator, artist, author and among the first major theoreticians of art therapy. She named her approach dynamically oriented art therapy. Prior to working in art therapy, she founded the Walden School of New York City.

Life and work 
Naumburg finished undergraduate studies at Vassar and Barnard colleges in New York.

She did graduate work at Columbia University with John Dewey in education and at the London School of Economics and Oxford. While in Italy she studied child education with Maria Montessori.
In 1914 Naumburg opened the first Montessori school in the United States. She opened "Children's School" which was later renamed Walden School in 1915 in New York City. It began with two teachers and ten students focusing on letting children develop their own interests and ideas. Naumburg believed children would not only learn knowledge, but learn how to use knowledge to their advantage. She believed understanding yourself was so important that she encouraged her staff at the school to undergo psychoanalysis.
Up to the present time, education has missed the real significance of the child's behavior by treating surface actions as isolated conditions. Having failed to recognize the true sources of behavior, it has been unable effectively to correct and guide the impulses of human growth.... The new advances in psychology, however, provide a key to the real understanding of what makes a child tick. Many notable individuals taught at the Walden School including Lewis Mumford, Hendrik van Loon, her sister Florence Cane, and Ernest Bloch.

Naumburg married writer Waldo Frank in 1916, with whom she had a son, Thomas, in 1922. They divorced in 1924. She started writing shortly after and published her first book in 1928.

Margaret Naumburg is attributed as introducing art as a therapeutic modality in the 1940s.< Between 1941–47 Naumburg worked at NY State Psychiatric Institute with adults and children and later published a series of case studies where she used art for diagnosis and therapy in the institution. However she was not alone in this endeavor. She was unique in using it as a primary agent rather than an auxiliary tool. She called her approach Dynamically Oriented Art Therapy based primarily on Freudian theory.The dynamic oriented approach was her main contribution to the art therapy community. This approach promotes " the release of spontaneous imagery" from the client through the symbols drawn and free association of the artworks. Naumburg viewed Art Therapy as a distinctive form of psychotherapy. She was also sympathetic to Jungian notions of universal symbolism and Harry Stack Sullivan's ideas about interpersonal psychiatry. Building off the work of Freud and Jung, Naumburg explored the inner personal meaning of symbols. Naumburg insisted the only valid interpretation of anyone's art came from the creator. She was skeptical about simple or rigid approaches to symbolic meaning consistent with Freud's teaching about dream analysis.
Naumburg wrote "when art teachings are routine it discourages efforts at spontaneous and creative expression forcing pupils" (Naumburg, 1973, p. 137) to recreate what they already know is good.

Naumburg's directive of choice was scribble drawing. Naumburg used large sheets of paper and allowed the patient to move their chosen material, paint or chalk pastel, around the page until satisfied but asked that the material not be lifted from the page from start to finish. After the drawing is created the drawer is then allowed to look at the artwork and try to create another form from the scribble. The client is encouraged to move the page around until an image is found. Once an image is seen in the scribble drawing, or painting, they are asked to color it in. At this point if the client wants to talk about the artwork while creating, they are encouraged to do so. This technique can also be done with the eyes closed. Closing the eyes encourages the creator to become less inhibited to force a form from the free flowing lines. Another way of using this technique is to use the nondominant hand. This forces the creator to use another part of the brain hopefully releasing the unconscious mind to form the symbolic imagery needed to gain access to more insight of the self. Scribble drawing was developed by her sister Florence Cane. She used this technique believing it helped release unconscious imagery.

Dynamically Oriented Art Therapy is based on recognizing that man's fundamental thoughts and feelings come from the unconscious. Often thoughts and feelings are reached through expression in images rather than words. Like psychoanalytic procedures, images may deal with dreams, fantasies, daydreams, fears, conflicts and memories. Whether trained or untrained individuals have the capacity to project their inner conflicts into visual form. In this approach, the therapist withholds interpretation encouraging clients to discover what their picture means to them. It was important to Naumburg to avoid interpreting or commenting on the client's artwork so the client would not change their mind about what was created and to avoid being wrong. Naumburg used art as the means for clients to visually project their conflicts, and when it was too difficult for the client to relax, she would provide them with art lessons or specific directive projects instead.

The American Art Therapy Association (ATA) recognized her pinnacle achievements with art as therapy with the highest honor by giving her the first Honorary Life Membership award. She was awarded the honor in 1971. She taught art therapy at undergraduate level at New York University. She successfully lobbied for the creation of a graduate level program at the university that began in 1969. Naumburg taught into her eighties. She died in 1983 at the age of 92.

Books

 The child and the world: Dialogues in modern education. (1928). New York: Harcourt, Brace. Digitized October 29, 2007. 
 Studies of the "Free" Expression of Behavior Problem Children as a Means of Diagnosis and Therapy, Publisher Coolidge Foundation, 1947 – Art 
 Schizophrenic Art: Its Meaning in Psychotherapy (1950) 
 Psychoneurotic Art, Its Function in Psychotherapy: correlation of the patient's Rorschach and other tests with the patient's art productions, by Adolpf G. Woltmann., Published 1953 
 Dynamically Oriented Art Therapy: Its Principles and Practice. (1966). New York: Grune & Stratton. Republished 1987, Chicago: Magnolia Street, 
 An Introduction to Art Therapy: Studies of the "Free" Art Expression of Behavior Problem Children and Adolescents as Means of Diagnosis and Therapy (Copyright 1950 and 1973 by Margaret Naumburg). Foreword to the first edition by Nolan D. C. Lewis, M.D. New York: Teachers College Press, Columbia University. Library of Congress Catalogue Card Number 73-78074

See also 
 Sigmund Freud
 Carl Jung
 Edward Adamson
 Adrian Hill
 Edith Kramer

References

External sources
 Search Margaret Naumberg papers at the University of Pennsylvania Libraries

Art therapists
American Jews
American women psychologists
20th-century American psychologists
1890 births
1961 deaths
Vassar College alumni
Barnard College alumni
Alumni of the London School of Economics
American expatriates in the United Kingdom
American expatriates in Italy